The Fujitsu Cup (富士通杯) was an international Go competition that ran from 1988-2011.

Outline
The Fujitsu Cup was an international Go competition hosted by Fujitsu and Yomiuri Shimbun. The players were selected as follows:

 The top 3 players from the previous year's competition
 7 players from Japan
 5 players from China
 5 players from South Korea
 1 player from Taiwan
 1 player from North America
 1 player from South America
 1 player from Europe

All 24 players played through preliminaries, until 8 players with the best record were given automatic advancement to the second round. The other 16 played against each other in the first round. The format was a single knockout, with 5.5 komi until 2002, 6.5 komi from 2003. The time limit was 3 hours' thinking time, and the winner's purse was ¥15,000,000 (≈$142,000).

In December 2011, the Japanese Go Association announced the permanent closure of the tournament.

Past winners and runners-up

External links
 
 The Fujitsu Cup games

References

Fujitsu Cup